Favourite Hymns (UK) or Favorite Hymns (US) may refer to:

Music
 Favorite Hymns, a 1989 album by Glen Campbell
 Your 100 Favourite Hymns, a five-LP Derek Batey series of the 1980s produced by Gordon Lorenz
 Jan Mulder's Favourite Hymns, a 2010 album by Jan Mulder

Other uses
 Aled's Forty Favourite Hymns, a 2009 book by Aled Jones
 My Favourite Hymns, a 1989–1993 UK TV programme with interviewer John Stapleton

See also
 List of English-language hymnals by denomination